Napuka Airport  is an airport on the atoll of Napuka, part of the Tuamotu Archipelago in French Polynesia. The airport is adjacent to the village of Tepukamaruia.

Airlines and destinations

References 

Airports in French Polynesia